Thomas Shimmin (1800 – c. 1876–1879) was a rag gatherer and poet nicknamed "Tom the Dipper" who lived in the Isle of Man.

He sang and wrote poetry in the Manx language and in English. His poems include,  Yn Coayl jeh'n Lillee (The Loss of the Lily), Happy Marriage of the Prince of Wales, and The Royal Manx Railway, or £5 of wit for a penny.

He was twice sentenced for robbery, first in 1843 and second in 1851. In 1843, he was sentenced to transportation to Australia, but was pardoned and released in July 1847. He also preached. He may have died in 1876 or 1879.

Happy Marriage of the Prince of Wales
But the despised metropolis,
I call it Castletown,
Although the Governor were amiss,
In honour did abound;
'Twas not alone the poor were fed,
But tradesmen and there spouse,
To the Town Hall were freely led,
And quickly filled the house.

References

Further reading
Wright, John The Manx MacGonigal: The poems, the life and world of Thomas Shimmin, Manx poet, known as Tom the Dipper. Onchan, 1997

1800 births
1876 deaths
Manx poets
19th-century poets
19th-century Manx writers